The quantum Heisenberg model, developed by Werner Heisenberg, is a statistical mechanical model used in the study of critical points and phase transitions of magnetic systems, in which the spins of the magnetic systems are treated quantum mechanically. It is related to the prototypical Ising model, where at each site of a lattice, a spin  represents a microscopic magnetic dipole to which the magnetic moment is either up or down. Except the coupling between magnetic dipole moments, there is also a multipolar version of Heisenberg model called the multipolar exchange interaction.

Overview
For quantum mechanical reasons (see exchange interaction or ), the dominant coupling between two dipoles may cause nearest-neighbors to have lowest energy when they are aligned.  Under this assumption (so that magnetic interactions only occur between adjacent dipoles) and on a 1-dimensional periodic lattice, the Hamiltonian can be written in the form

,

where  is the coupling constant and dipoles are represented by classical vectors (or "spins") σj, subject to the periodic boundary condition .    
The Heisenberg model is a more realistic model in that it treats the spins quantum-mechanically, by replacing the spin by a quantum operator acting upon the tensor product , of dimension . To define it, recall the Pauli spin-1/2 matrices

,

,

,

The objective is to determine the spectrum of the Hamiltonian, from which the partition function can be calculated and the thermodynamics of the system can be studied.

The spin 1/2 Heisenberg model in one dimension may be solved exactly using the Bethe ansatz. In the algebraic formulation, these are related to particular quantum affine algebras and elliptic quantum groups in the XXZ and XYZ cases respectively. Other approaches do so without Bethe ansatz.

XXX model 
The physics of the Heisenberg XXX model strongly depends on the sign of the coupling constant
 and the dimension of the space. For positive  the ground state is always ferromagnetic. At negative  the ground state is antiferromagnetic in two and three dimensions. In one dimension the nature of correlations in the antiferromagnetic Heisenberg model depends on the spin of the magnetic dipoles. If the spin is integer then only short-range order is present. A system of half-integer spins exhibits quasi-long range order.

A simplified version of Heisenberg model is the one-dimensional Ising model, where the transverse magnetic field is in the x-direction, and the interaction is only in the z-direction:

.

At small g and large g, the ground state degeneracy is different, which implies that there must be a quantum phase transition in between. It can be solved exactly for the critical point using the duality analysis.
Under periodic boundary conditions, the transformed Hamiltonian can be shown is of a very similar form:

but for the  attached to the spin interaction term.

Applications
 Another important object is entanglement entropy. One way to describe it is to subdivide the unique ground state into a block (several sequential spins) and the environment (the rest of the ground state). The entropy of the block can be considered as entanglement entropy. At zero temperature in the critical region (thermodynamic limit) it scales logarithmically with the size of the block. As the temperature increases the logarithmic dependence changes into a linear function. For large temperatures linear dependence follows from the second law of thermodynamics.

 The Heisenberg model provides an important and tractable theoretical example for applying density matrix renormalisation.

 The six-vertex model can be solved using the algebraic Bethe ansatz for the Heisenberg spin chain (see Baxter, "Exactly Solved Models in Statistical Mechanics").

 The half-filled Hubbard model in the limit of strong repulsive interactions can be mapped onto a Heisenberg model with  representing the strength of the superexchange interaction.

See also
Classical Heisenberg model
DMRG of the Heisenberg model
Quantum rotor model
t-J model
J1 J2 model
Majumdar–Ghosh model
AKLT model
Multipolar exchange interaction

References 
 R.J. Baxter, Exactly solved models in statistical mechanics, London, Academic Press, 1982

Notes

Spin models
Quantum magnetism
Quantum lattice models
Magnetic ordering
Werner Heisenberg